The canton of Mana (French: Canton de Mana) is one of the former cantons of the Guyane department in French Guiana. It was located in the arrondissement of Saint-Laurent-du-Maroni, and consisted of two communes. Its administrative seat was located in Mana. Its population was 10,661 in 2012.

Communes 
The canton was composed of 2 communes:
Mana
Awala-Yalimapo

Administration

References 

Mana